The South Carolina Gamecocks football program represents the University of South Carolina. The Gamecocks compete in the Football Bowl Subdivision of the National Collegiate Athletic Association (NCAA) and the Eastern Division of the Southeastern Conference. The team's head coach is Shane Beamer. They play their home games at Williams–Brice Stadium.

From 1953 through 1970, the Gamecocks played in the Atlantic Coast Conference, winning the 1969 ACC championship and finishing No. 15 in the 1958 final AP poll. From 1971 through 1991, they competed as a major independent, producing 1980 Heisman Trophy winner George Rogers, six bowl appearances, and Final Top-25 rankings in 1984 and 1987 (AP No. 11 and No. 15). Since 1992, they have competed in the Southeastern Conference, winning the SEC East division in 2010 and posting seven final Top-25 rankings including three Top-10 finishes.

South Carolina has produced a National Coach of the Year in Joe Morrison (1984), three SEC coaches of the year in Lou Holtz (2000) and Steve Spurrier (2005, 2010), one ACC coach of the year in Paul Dietzel (1969), and two overall #1 NFL Draft picks in George Rogers (1981) and Jadeveon Clowney (2014). They also have five members of the College Football Hall of Fame in former players George Rogers and Sterling Sharpe, and former coaches Holtz and Spurrier as well as former Athletic Director Mike McGee.

History

Early history (1892–1965)
Carolina fielded its first football team on Christmas Eve, in Charleston, South Carolina, in 1892 versus Furman. At that time the football team was not sanctioned by the university. They provided their own uniforms and paid their own train fare in order to participate in the game. They were nicknamed the "College Boys" by The News and Courier and their supporters wore garnet and black.

USC won its first game in its third season, on November 2, 1895, against Columbia AA. The squad designated their first head coach, W. H. "Dixie" Whaley, the following year. The 1896 season also saw the inaugural game against arch-rival Clemson on November 12, which Carolina won 12–6. From 1902 to 1903, coach Bob Williams led the Gamecocks to a 14–3 record. In 1902, South Carolina beat Clemson, coached by John Heisman, for the first time since 1896, the first year of the rivalry. "The Carolina fans that week were carrying around a poster with the image of a tiger with a gamecock standing on top of it, holding the tiger's tail as if he was steering the tiger by the tail", Jay McCormick said. "Naturally, the Clemson guys didn't take too kindly to that, and on Wednesday and again on Thursday, there were sporadic fistfights involving brass knuckles and other objects and so forth, some of which resulted, according to the newspapers, in blood being spilled and persons having to seek medical assistance. After the game on Thursday, the Clemson guys frankly told the Carolina students that if you bring this poster, which is insulting to us, to the big parade on Friday, you're going to be in trouble. And naturally, of course, the Carolina students brought the poster to the parade. If you give someone an ultimatum and they're your rival, they're going to do exactly what you told them not to do."

As expected, another brawl broke out before both sides agreed to mutually burn the poster in an effort to defuse tensions. The immediate aftermath resulted in the stoppage of the rivalry until 1909. 1903 also heralded the program's first 8-win season with an overall record of 8–2. Future senator and former star player for South Carolina and UVA, Christie Benet led the Gamecocks from 1904 to 1905 and 1908 to 1909. 1904's captain Gene Oliver played against Georgia with a broken jaw.

The Board of Trustees banned participation in football for the 1906 season after the faculty complained that the coarseness of chants and cheers, yelled by the students at football games, were not gentlemanly in nature. Within months The Board of Trustees reversed their decision after hearing pleas, and receiving petitions, from students and alumni alike. Play was allowed to resume in 1907. A hastily assembled football team, coached by Board of Trustees member Douglas McKay, competed in an abbreviated season that same year, and the squad won all three games. In 1910, South Carolina hired John Neff from UVA. Norman B. Edgerton coached the team from 1912 to 1915. A. B. Stoney played on the team. Yet another UVA grad, W. Rice Warren coached the 1916 team. Frank Dobson led the war-torn 1918 team to a 2–1–1 record. Coach Sol Metzger led the 1921 team to a 5–1–2 record, losing only to Billy Laval's Furman. Branch Bocock coached the 1925 and 1926 teams.

Billy Laval, a Columbia native, came to USC from Furman. Laval accepted a three-year contract worth $8,000 per year to coach the Gamecocks, which made him the highest-paid coach in the state. From 1928 to 1934, he led the Gamecocks to seven consecutive winning seasons and a 39–26–6 overall record, which included a perfect 3–0 Southern Conference campaign in 1933. Laval is one of only two South Carolina football coaches to have produced seven consecutive winning seasons (Steve Spurrier is the other, from 2008 to 2014). In 2009, The State called him "the greatest collegiate coach" in the history of South Carolina. Laval left USC after six seasons to coach multiple sports at Emory and Henry College, partly due to differences over his contract with the USC athletics department. 1934 was the first season that Williams–Brice Stadium was used. Prior to this, South Carolina played its home games on the school's campus. Don McCallister led the Gamecocks for three seasons before being replaced. His final record is 13–20–1.

Under coach Rex Enright, who came to USC from his post as an assistant coach at Georgia, the Gamecocks produced another undefeated Southern Conference season, (4–0–1), in 1941. After the 1942 season, Enright joined the United States Navy serving as a lieutenant and working mostly in their athletic program in the United States. After three head coaches (James P. Moran, Williams Newton, John D. McMillan) who had gone 10–10–5 combined in four years with one bowl appearance, Enright returned to the Gamecocks in 1946 as head football coach, and remained until 1955 when he resigned for health reasons.  He hired Warren Giese as his successor, and continued as athletic director until 1960. The Rex Enright Athletic Center on the South Carolina campus was named for him and the Rex Enright Award (also known as the Captain's Cup) given to the football captains of the previous season. Enright gave-up his coaching duties in 1955 due to reasons related to poor health. Enright retired with the distinction of being the head coach with the most wins and losses in school history (64–69–7), and he still retains the record for most school losses and is 2nd in wins. Warren Giese, who was previously an assistant coach at Maryland, was hired as head coach in 1956, and he led the Gamecocks to a 28–21–1 overall record in his 5-year tenure. Giese employed a conservative, run-first game strategy, but he enthusiastically adopted the two-point conversion when it was made legal in 1958. That year, he also correctly predicted the rise of special teams after the NCAA relaxed its player substitution rules. The Giese era included two 7–3 campaigns (1956 and 1958), an 18–15–1 ACC record, and a 27–21 victory over Darrell Royal's 1957 Texas squad in Austin. Griese was replaced after a 3–6 season in 1960. Marvin Bass was hired away from Georgia Tech, where he served as defensive coordinator, as the Gamecocks head football coach. He posted a 17–29–4 record in his four-year tenure and was replaced after five seasons due to the team's struggles and low fan support.

Paul Dietzel era (1966–1974)

Paul Dietzel arrived in Columbia prior to the 1966 season, having previously coached at LSU, where he won a national championship, and Army.

In 1969, he led the Gamecocks to an ACC championship and an appearance in the Peach Bowl. As a result, Dietzel was named ACC Coach of the Year that season. Soon after, South Carolina left the ACC and became an Independent program prior to the 1971 season. Dietzel finished his USC tenure with a 42–53–1 overall record (18–10–1 ACC). In addition to the 1969 ACC title, Dietzel's legacies at Carolina include his improvement of athletic facilities and his penning of a new fight song, which is still used to this day ("The Fighting Gamecocks Lead the Way"). Amid growing fan unrest after an upset loss to Duke, Dietzel announced that he would resign at the end of the season, which ended in a 4–7 record.

Jim Carlen era (1975–1981)
Jim Carlen, previously head football coach at Texas Tech and West Virginia, took over as coach in 1975. Under his leadership the program achieved a measure of national prominence. Carlen led the Gamecocks to three bowl games, coached 1980 Heisman Trophy winner George Rogers, and produced a 45–36–1 record during his tenure. The Carlen Era included consecutive 8–4 finishes (1979–1980) and only one losing season in seven years. The 1980 season was headlined by senior running back George Rogers, who led the nation in rushing with 1,894 yards. For his efforts, the Downtown Athletic Club named Rogers the winner of the 1980 Heisman Trophy award. Rogers beat out a strong group of players, including Georgia running back Herschel Walker. Behind the Rogers-led rushing attack, the Gamecocks went 8–4 overall and earned an appearance in the Gator Bowl. In addition, the 1980 Gamecocks defeated a heavily favored Michigan squad coached by the legendary Bo Schembechler. The 17–14 victory in Ann Arbor, which made Rogers a household name, was one of the biggest wins in both the Carlen Era and the program's history. Carlen retired from coaching after seven seasons at USC.

Joe Morrison era (1983–1988)

Joe Morrison was hired in 1983 following a one-year stint by Richard Bell. After a 5–6 mark in his first year, the "Man in Black" led South Carolina to a 10–2 record, No. 11 final AP Poll ranking, and a Gator Bowl appearance in 1984. It was also before the 1984 season began that the team removed the Astroturf that had been in place at Williams–Brice Stadium since the early 1970s and reinstalled the natural grass that remains today. The 1984 season included victories over Georgia, Pittsburgh, Notre Dame, Florida State, and Clemson. The 1984 defense was called the "Fire Ant" defense. In 1987, the Gamecocks posted an 8–4 record, No. 15 Final AP Poll ranking, and another Gator Bowl trip. The 1987 Gamecocks were led by the "Black Death" defense, which held seven opponents to 10 or fewer points and yielded just 141 points in 12 games played. Morrison coached his last game in the 1988 Liberty Bowl, as he died of a heart attack on February 5, 1989, at the age of 51. He finished his USC tenure with a 39–28–2 overall record, three bowl appearances, and three seasons with 8 or more wins. Due to his on-field success and "Black Magic" image (he traditionally wore all black on the sideline and introduced black uniforms into the team's rotation), Morrison remains a popular figure in Gamecock lore. Morrison also began the tradition at Carolina, with his first game in 1983, of the pre-game entrance of the football team to the beginning of Also sprach Zarathustra, the theme from the film "2001: A Space Odyssey". This is still part of the Carolina football game day experience over 30 years later.

Sparky Woods era (1989–1993)
Following Morrison's death, Sparky Woods was hired away from Appalachian State as head coach in 1989 and coached the Gamecocks until the end of the 1993 season. He posted winning seasons in 1989 and 1990, but could not produce another winning campaign during his tenure. Woods led the USC football program through the transition to the SEC and has the distinction of being South Carolina's first head coach in SEC play, as the Gamecocks entered the conference in 1992. Woods' overall record at South Carolina was 25–27–3.

Brad Scott era (1994–1998)
Brad Scott left his post as offensive coordinator at Florida State and took over as the Gamecocks head coach in December 1993. Despite modest preseason expectations, he led USC to a 7–5 record and a Carquest Bowl victory over West Virginia in his first season. The bowl win was the first post-season victory in the program's long history. However, Scott was unable to capitalize on his early success.  USC only had one non-losing record in SEC play during his tenure, only one other winning overall record, and won only six games in his final two seasons. Scott was fired by athletics director Mike McGee after a 1–10 season in 1998 in which the Gamecocks lost their final ten games of the season. Scott's final record at South Carolina was 23–32–1 in five seasons.

Lou Holtz era (1999–2004)

Former Notre Dame head coach Lou Holtz came out of retirement and was hired as USC's head coach in 1999. He inherited a relatively young SEC program (joined in 1992) that posted only three winning seasons from 1990 to 1998. USC won just a single game the year before Holtz's arrival and, subsequently, went 0–11 in his inaugural campaign.

It didn't take long for Holtz to improve the Gamecocks' fortunes, however, as he engineered 8–4 and 9–3 records in the 2000 and 2001 seasons. In addition, USC won consecutive Outback Bowls over Ohio State and produced the most successful two-year run in program history (at the time), going 17–7 overall and 10–6 in SEC play. The 2000 and 2001 campaigns also saw USC's return to the polls, as the Gamecocks turned in No. 19 and No. 13 rankings in the Final AP ballots for those years. After consecutive 5–7 finishes in 2002 and 2003 (in which the team was ranked in the Top 25 during both seasons), Holtz ended his USC tenure on a winning note with a 6–5 record in 2004 before retiring again. Holtz finished with a 33–37 overall record at South Carolina.

In 2005, USC was placed on 3 years probation by the NCAA for actions during the coaching tenure of Lou Holtz, all of which were self-reported by the school. Five of these actions were considered major violations, and included such activities as impermissible tutoring and non-voluntary summer workouts as well as a "lack of institutional control". Coach Holtz pointed out following the close of the investigation, "There was no money involved. No athletes were paid. There were no recruiting inducements. No cars. No jobs offered. No ticket scandal, etc."

Steve Spurrier era (2005–2015)

Former Washington Redskins and Florida head coach Steve Spurrier was hired in 2005 to replace the retiring Lou Holtz. Spurrier led the Gamecocks to a 7–5 record and Independence Bowl appearance in his first season. As a result, Spurrier was named the 2005 SEC Coach of the Year. The 2006 season saw an 8–5 record and a victory over Houston in the Liberty Bowl. In 2007, the Gamecocks started the season 6–1, but would lose all of their next five games. South Carolina posted consecutive 7–6 records in 2008 and 2009, returning to postseason play with appearances in the Outback Bowl and PapaJohns.com Bowl. They also defeated a Top 5 opponent for the first time ever in 2009 when they upset then-No. 4 Ole Miss 16–10 at home on a Thursday night.

In 2010, Spurrier scored another first with the first SEC Eastern Division Championship in school history and the program's first win over a No. 1 team in program history, with a 35–21 victory over top-ranked, defending national champion Alabama. In 2011, Spurrier led USC to its most successful season in program history. The Gamecocks posted an 11–2 overall record, went 6–2 in SEC play, and defeated No. 20 Nebraska in the Capital One Bowl to earn Final Top 10 rankings in the AP and Coaches' Polls (No. 9 and No. 8, respectively). The University of South Carolina was investigated in 2011–12 by the NCAA regarding an estimated $59,000 in impermissible benefits provided to student-athletes including football players including discounted living expenses at a local hotel. The school imposed its own punishment, paying $18,500 in fines and cutting three football scholarships in each of the 2013 and 2014 seasons, and reduction in official recruiting visits for the 2012–13 year. The NCAA accepted these self-imposed punishments.

In 2012 Steve Spurrier, once again, led his South Carolina football team to double-digit wins during the course of the regular season campaign. The 2012 regular season culminated with the annual season-ending game against arch-rival Clemson at Clemson's Memorial Stadium. In 2013, Spurrier and the Gamecocks finished with another extremely successful 11–2 season capped by a 34–22 victory over the No. 19 Wisconsin in the 2014 Capital One Bowl. South Carolina finished with the highest ranking in school history in the AP poll, ranked at No. 4 in the country.

On October 12, 2015, after a 2–4 start to the season, Spurrier announced to his team that he would be resigning, effective immediately. Offensive line coach/co-offensive coordinator Shawn Elliott was named the team's interim head coach. Elliott led the Gamecocks to victory the following week against Vanderbilt but lost the final five games of the season. Many of South Carolina's most successful seasons came during the Steve Spurrier era, including a SEC East Division championship in 2010 and three consecutive eleven win seasons (2011–13). Spurrier also boasted a 6–4 record against the school's in-state rival, Clemson, including five consecutive wins during the 2009–2013 seasons.

Will Muschamp era (2016–2020) 

Auburn defensive coordinator and former Florida head coach Will Muschamp was named as South Carolina's new head coach on December 6, 2015.

The Will Muschamp era began with a victory over Vanderbilt by a score of 13–10. After a 2–4 start, Carolina won four of their final six regular season contests, including a 24–21 victory over 18th-ranked Tennessee. The Gamecocks' 2016 campaign ended with a 46–39 overtime loss to South Florida in the 2016 Birmingham Bowl. In 2017 Muschamp led the Gamecocks to a 9–4 season. The season started with a neutral site win against NC State in the Belk Kickoff Game in Charlotte, North Carolina. In conference play South Carolina defeated five SEC schools: Florida, Tennessee, Missouri, Vanderbilt, and Arkansas, finishing second in the SEC East. They finished the season with a 26–19 victory over Michigan in the Outback Bowl. The 2018 season saw Muschamp and the Gamecocks finish with a 7–5 regular season finish and a 28–0 loss to Virginia in the Belk Bowl in Charlotte, NC. South Carolina finished the 2019 season with a mark of 4–8, highlighted by a road upset over Georgia.

The 2020 season was played with a conference-only schedule, due to the ongoing COVID-19 pandemic. The Gamecocks started off the season 2-2, with a win over then No. 15 Auburn. The Gamecocks then lost three straight, allowing 159 points in the process. Muschamp was dismissed as head coach on November 15, 2020, after starting the 2020 season with a 2–5 record with Mike Bobo being named interim head coach for the rest of the season.

Shane Beamer era (2021–present) 
On December 6, 2020, University of South Carolina athletic director Ray Tanner announced that the school had hired Oklahoma associate head coach/tight ends coach Shane Beamer as its head coach. Beamer, the son of legendary Virginia Tech head coach Frank Beamer, led the 2021 Gamecocks to a 7–6 record, including a 38–21 win in the Duke's Mayo Bowl over North Carolina.

The Gamecocks' 2022 season displayed significant growth under Shane Beamer's leadership in his second year as head coach. Despite inconsistent offensive production and a lackluster rush defense throughout the season, the Gamecocks finished on a high note, posting an 8–5 record and finishing the season ranked at No. 23 in both the Coaches and AP poll, their first top 25 finish since the 2013 season. Additionally, Shane Beamer became the first coach in program history to win back-to-back games against top ten opponents after beating #5 Tennessee and their in-state rival #8 Clemson in weeks 12 and 13, respectively. South Carolina's dominant 63–38 victory against Tennessee set the record for most points scored by an unranked team against a top-five team in college football history. During the same game, South Carolina quarterback Spencer Rattler gave a legendary performance, throwing for 438 passing yards and six touchdowns, breaking the school record for most touchdown passes in a single game. The Gamecocks were invited to play against the #21 Notre Dame Fighting Irish in the TaxSlayer Gator Bowl.  Although South Carolina played a competitive game with a relatively depleted roster, they ultimately lost to the Irish by a score of 45–38.

Conference affiliations
South Carolina has affiliated with three conferences and twice been an independent.
 Independent (1892–1921) 
 Southern Conference (1922–1952)
 Atlantic Coast Conference (1953–1970)
 Independent (1971–1991) 
 Southeastern Conference (1992–present)

Head coaches

South Carolina has had 36 head coaches. Shane Beamer became head coach in 2020.

† Interim

Championships

Conference championships

Division championships 
The SEC has been split into two divisions since the 1992 season with the Gamecocks competing in the SEC East since that time.

Bowl games
South Carolina has 25 bowl appearances, with a 10–15 record overall.

Rivalries

Clemson

The rivalry is the largest annual sporting event by ticket sales in the state of South Carolina. From 1896 to 1959, the Carolina-Clemson game was played on the fairgrounds in Columbia, South Carolina, and was referred to as "Big Thursday." In 1960 an alternating-site format was implemented utilizing both teams' home stadiums. The annual game has since been officially designated "The Palmetto Bowl". It is the 21st most played college football rivalry at 115 meetings. The Gamecocks won 5 in a row against Clemson between 2009 and 2013, Clemson then won 7 straight, but failed to extend their win streak in the series with a 31–30 loss in 2022. Clemson holds a 72–43–4 all-time lead in the series as of the conclusion of the 2022 season. The South Carolina Gamecocks did not play the Clemson Tigers in 2020 due to COVID-19 restrictions.

Georgia

A "border rivalry" dating to 1894. The 1980 game was between future Heisman Trophy winners George Rogers and Herschel Walker. Led by Walker's 219 rushing yards, Georgia won 13–10 and would go on to capture the National Championship. Rogers turned in 168 rushing yards during the course of the battle, setting the stage for a successful finish to his senior season and eventual Heisman Trophy award. The matchup has been televised yearly since 1997. The series has been far more competitive since USC joined the SEC in 1992. Georgia holds a 53-19–2 overall lead in the series as of the 2021 season.

Missouri

A budding rivalry between the two schools located in cities named Columbia. Although Missouri is the only school to beat the Gamecocks in multiple bowl games, the rivalry began in 2012, when Missouri joined South Carolina in the SEC East. A Mayor's Cup trophy is awarded to the winner of the annual game by the mayors of Columbia, South Carolina and Columbia, Missouri.

North Carolina

The rivalry began in 1903.  While no longer a conference rivalry, since South Carolina left the ACC in 1971, the teams still meet occasionally. In the 2010s, the series had been played primarily on a Thursday. It was announced in September 2015 that USC and UNC will play every four years in 2019 and 2023. South Carolina has won 7 out of the last 9 meetings; North Carolina leads the all-time series 35–20–4 as of the conclusion of the 2021 season.

Notable seasons

1933 – Undefeated in the Southern Conference 

In 1933, under the direction of the legendary Billy Laval, the Gamecocks went undefeated in conference play. However, Duke would finish with a better conference record by one win and was awarded the championship.

1969 – ACC champions 

In 1969, the Gamecocks won the ACC Championship by going undefeated in conference play. In its six ACC matchups, USC outscored its opponents by a 130–61 margin. The squad posted a 7–4 overall record with a Peach Bowl appearance against West Virginia to close the season (14–3 loss). Two years later, South Carolina left the ACC and competed as an Independent for two decades before joining the SEC in 1992.

1980 – Heisman Trophy 

In 1980, the Gamecocks had a successful season led by running back George Rogers, who won the prestigious Heisman Trophy and was chosen #1 overall in the 1981 NFL Draft. The team finished 8–4, with the biggest win coming against the eventual Big Ten champion Michigan Wolverines in front of a crowd of over 104,000 at Michigan Stadium.

1984 – "Black Magic" 

Led by Coach Morrison, the 1984 Gamecocks became the first team in school history to win 10 games (10–2 record) and were ranked as high as No. 2 in the polls before losing to an unranked Navy team 38–21 in the 10th game of the season. The Gamecocks finished No. 11 in the final AP Poll. Along the way, they defeated Georgia, Pittsburgh, Notre Dame, Florida State, and Clemson to earn an appearance in the Gator Bowl against Oklahoma State (21–14 loss). At the time, the No. 11 final ranking was the highest ever achieved by South Carolina. The team was nicknamed "Black Magic" due to their success and their distinctive black jerseys.

2000 – Winless to Top 25 

South Carolina made one of the biggest turnarounds in college football history, going from a winless season in 1999 to an eight-win campaign in 2000. Their first win of the season, against New Mexico State, came two years to the day after their previous win, against Ball State on September 2, 1998. South Carolina's turnaround in conference play was also one of the biggest in SEC history, going from 0–8 in 1999, to 5–3 in 2000 including a victory against a heavily favored Georgia team that ended the Gamecocks' SEC losing streak. South Carolina fans tore down the goalposts at Williams-Brice Stadium on both occasions in celebration. On New Year's Day 2001, the Gamecocks defeated Ohio State in the Outback Bowl in Tampa, Florida. South Carolina finished the season ranked #19 in the AP Poll and #21 in the Coaches Poll.

2010 – SEC East champions 

In 2010, the Gamecocks won their first SEC Eastern Division Championship, going 5–3 in conference play. For the first time in school history, they defeated the No. 1 ranked team in the country (Alabama) and won at Florida in the division-clinching game. The season also included victories over division foes Georgia, Tennessee, and Vanderbilt as well as instate Atlantic Coast Conference rival Clemson. In their first appearance in the SEC Championship Game, the Gamecocks lost to No. 1 Auburn, 56–17.

2011 – First 11-Win Season 

Led by Coach Spurrier, the 2011 Gamecocks achieved its most wins in a single season and finished in the Top 10 for the first time in program history. USC posted an 11–2 overall record, went 6–2 in SEC play, and won the Capital One Bowl to finish No. 9/8 in the final AP and Coaches' Polls (respectively). Along the way, USC defeated Georgia, Tennessee, Florida, and Clemson to extend its winning streak over its biggest rivals to 3 games. This was also the first season that USC posted a 5–0 record against their SEC Eastern Division opponents.

2012 – Back-to-Back 11-Win Seasons 

Spurrier's 2012 Gamecocks went 11–2, with their only losses coming at LSU and at Florida in consecutive weeks. USC defeated rival Clemson 27–17 in Death Valley to end the regular season. They then defeated Michigan 33–28 in the 2013 Outback Bowl with the game decided by a 28-yard touchdown pass from Dylan Thompson to Bruce Ellington with under a minute to go. The Gamecocks finished the season ranked No. 8/7 in the final AP and Coaches' Polls respectively.

2013 – 3 in a Row 11-Win Seasons 

Again led by Coach Spurrier, the 2013 Gamecocks went 11–2, with their losses coming at Georgia and at Tennessee. Notable wins included Vanderbilt, UCF, and Missouri all of which finished ranked in the top 25. USC finished the regular season by defeating rival Clemson 31–17, marking Carolina's fifth straight win over their in-state rival. This was also the first Palmetto Bowl between top ten teams, with Carolina and Clemson ranked No. 10 and No. 6 respectively. South Carolina also completed their second consecutive season with an undefeated record on their home field, Williams–Brice Stadium. The Gamecocks' 18 game home win streak, dating back to the 2011 season, was good for the longest home winning streak in the nation at the time. The team ended the season with a 34–24 victory over Wisconsin in the 2014 Capital One Bowl. The Gamecocks finished the season ranked No. 4 in both the final AP and Coaches' polls, marking the first top five finish in program history.

2022 – Return to the Top 25 

The Gamecocks posted an 8–5 record and finished the season ranked at No. 23 in both the Coaches and AP poll, their first top 25 finish since the 2013 season. Shane Beamer became the first coach in program history to win back-to-back games against top ten opponents after beating #5 Tennessee and their in-state rival #8 Clemson. South Carolina's dominant 63–38 victory against Tennessee set the record for most points scored by an unranked team against a top-five team in college football history.

Award winners

 Heisman Trophy
 George Rogers – 1980
Consensus All-Americans
George Rogers – 1980
Del Wilkes – 1984
Melvin Ingram – 2011
Jadeveon Clowney – 2012
 Chic Harley Award
 George Rogers – 1980
 Walter Camp Coach of the Year Award
 Joe Morrison – 1984
 Southern Conference Player of the Year
 Steve Wadiak – 1950
 Atlantic Coast Conference Coach of the Year
 Paul Dietzel – 1969
 Atlantic Coast Conference Player of the Year
 Alex Hawkins – 1958
 Billy Gambrell – 1962
 Southeastern Conference Coach of the Year
 Lou Holtz – 2000
 Steve Spurrier – 2005, 2010
 Walter Camp Alumni of the Year
 George Rogers – 2004
 Disney Spirit Award
 Tim Frisby – 2004
Sporting News Freshman of the Year
Marcus Lattimore – 2010
 Southeastern Conference Freshman of the Year
 Steve Taneyhill – 1992
 Marcus Lattimore – 2010
 Jadeveon Clowney – 2011
 Ted Hendricks Award
 Jadeveon Clowney – 2012
 AT&T ESPN All-America Player of the Year
 Jadeveon Clowney – 2012
South Carolina Football Hall of Fame Blanchard-Rogers Trophy
Kevin Harris – 2021
ESPY Award for Best Play
Jadeveon Clowney – 2013
FWAA First-Year Coach of the Year 
Shane Beamer – 2021

College Football Hall of Famers

Syvelle Newton joins the "600 Club"

From 2003 to 2006, Syvelle Newton played multiple positions for the Gamecocks and left his mark on the national record books in the process. He became one of only four players in college football history to record 600+ yards passing, rushing, and receiving (each) in a collegiate career. In Newton's four seasons, he posted 2,474 passing yards (20 TD, 13 INT), 786 rushing yards (10 TD), and 673 receiving yards (3 TD). He also returned 6 kickoffs for 115 yards (19.2 average) and made 18 tackles and an assisted sack in limited defensive action.

Gamecock traditions
 "Fighting Gamecock Logo – USC's helmet, regardless of color, has featured a fighting gamecock since 1969. This bird, which includes metal spurs, is usually featured inside a Block C but is also displayed by itself.  Helmets have been white with garnet and black trim and Gamecock logo with or without the block C, Garnet with white and black trim with Gamecock Block C logo, Black with garnet and white trim with Gamecock Block C logo and in 2015 they unveiled some Block C logos with a chrome finish and a White helmet with oversized tail end of the Gamecock logo in Chrome Garnet.
 "2001" Entrance – The Gamecocks' enter Williams–Brice Stadium to the introduction of "Also sprach Zarathustra", popularly known from the film "2001: A Space Odyssey". This tradition was started by Coach Joe Morrison with his first game in 1983.
 "Carolina" and "Gamecocks" on Jersey – USC has intermittently featured the script "Carolina" and "Gamecocks" on the front of its jersey since coach Jim Carlen's arrival in 1975. While the jersey used "Gamecocks" for much of the 1980s and early 1990s, it has solely used "Carolina" on its jersey since the late 1990s.
 Cockaboose Railroad – In 1990, cabooses renovated in Gamecock colors and decor became part of the USC tailgate scene. They sit on a dormant railroad track near Williams–Brice Stadium.
 S.C. Flag and Palmetto Tree/Crescent – As South Carolina's flagship university, USC prominently displays the state flag and Palmetto Tree/Crescent logo on game days. In addition to players entering the field with the state flag flying in advance during "2001", the stadium's playing surface is adorned with garnet and white Palmetto Tree/Crescent logos, and the state flag is represented by decals on the back of players' helmets.
 "If It Ain't Swayin', Then We Ain't Playin" – Originating from a Joe Morrison comment about the reported "swaying" of the Williams–Brice Stadium upper deck during a 38–14 win over Southern California in 1983, "if it ain't swayin', we ain't playin'" became a catchphrase for Carolina fans, even after the East Upper Deck of Williams–Brice Stadium had additional supports added to reduce the swaying.
 Sir Big Spur – Sir Big Spur (originally called Cocky Doodle Lou), the university's official live gamecock, attends USC football and baseball games.
 Cocky – Cocky has been the USC mascot since 1980. Cocky is the four-time "national champion", five-time "All-American" mascot & 2003 winner of the Capital One National Mascot of the Year for the Gamecocks. The "son" of Carolina's original mascot Big Spur, Cocky appears at every USC home football contest, making a "magical" appearance at the climax of the 2001 opening sequence.
 Sandstorm – Beginning in October 2008, the song "Sandstorm" by Darude is played before South Carolina starts the game and after South Carolina is kicking the ball to the opposing team after a score; the song is stopped when the kicker makes contact with the football. As the song is played, fans wave white rally towels over their heads.
 Tiger Burn – before facing off their archrival Clemson, South Carolina holds the "Tiger Burn", a pep rally where a tiger statue built by students is burned down. This tradition begun in 1902.
 Orange Crush – after joining the SEC in 1991, USC's final three regular season games throughout the decade were against Tennessee, Florida, and Clemson in that order. The term "Orange Crush" was used to describe this final stretch as all three teams wear orange and for its reputation as the most difficult portion of the season. Changes to schedule structure after 2000 meant that teams besides Tennessee and Florida were often the last two opponents before Clemson, slowly leading to the term's decline in usage. The term was revived and embraced by Shane Beamer in the 2022 season with the Gamecocks final stretch against Florida, Tennessee, and Clemson. Though they failed to beat Florida, they ended their season on back-to-back upsets against Tennessee and Clemson, both of which were top 10 teams.

Logos and uniforms
In the 2009 season, USC wore a special uniform against Florida in support of the Wounded Warrior Project.  This was repeated in the 2011 season against Auburn, and during the 2012 season against LSU.

Before the start of the 2013 season, USC debuted new uniforms made by Under Armour. The stripes on the front of the shoulders were moved to the top of the shoulder. The uniforms contain 11 total stripes – the same number of buildings as the national historic landmark known as The Horseshoe on the campus of the university.

Retired numbers

Numbers of five players have been retired.

Gamecocks in the NFL

The following is a list of Gamecock players listed on active or practice rosters in the NFL as of June 2022.
 Zack Bailey, G – Los Angeles Chargers
 Damiere Byrd, WR – Atlanta Falcons
 A. J. Cann, G – Houston Texans
 Joseph Charlton, P – Cleveland Browns
 Jadeveon Clowney, DE – Cleveland Browns
 Dennis Daley, G – Carolina Panthers
 Mike Davis, RB – Baltimore Ravens
 Rico Dowdle, RB – Dallas Cowboys
 Bryan Edwards, WR – Atlanta Falcons
 Jabari Ellis, DT – New York Giants
 Kingsley Enagbare, OLB – Green Bay Packers
 Rashad Fenton, CB – Kansas City Chiefs
 Stephon Gilmore, CB – Indianapolis Colts
 Kevin Harris, RB – New England Patriots
Jaycee Horn, CB – Carolina Panthers
 Hayden Hurst, TE – Cincinnati Bengals
 Sadarius Hutcherson, G – Tampa Bay Buccaneers
 Melvin Ingram, LB – Miami Dolphins
Ernest Jones, LB – Los Angeles Rams
 Javon Kinlaw, DT – San Francisco 49ers
 Chris Lammons, CB – Kansas City Chiefs
 Kyle Markway, TE – Los Angeles Rams
Israel Mukuamu, S – Dallas Cowboys
Nick Muse, TE – Minnesota Vikings
 Keisean Nixon, CB - Green Bay Packers
 Carlins Platel, DB – Pittsburgh Steelers
 Adam Prentice, FB – New Orleans Saints
 Deebo Samuel, WR – San Francisco 49ers
Shi Smith, WR – Carolina Panthers
 Taylor Stallworth, DT – Indianapolis Colts
 Ryan Succop, K – Tampa Bay Buccaneers
 ZaQuandre White, RB – Miami Dolphins
 D. J. Wonnum, DE – Minnesota Vikings

Future opponents

Non-division opponents 
South Carolina plays Texas A&M as a permanent non-division opponent annually and rotates around the West division among the other six schools.

Non-conference opponents 
Announced schedules as of November 16, 2022.
No game scheduled for 2032 season other than annual match-up with Clemson.

† Will be played at Bank of America Stadium in Charlotte, North Carolina

††  Will be played at Mercedes-Benz Stadium in Atlanta, Georgia

References

External links

 

 
American football teams established in 1892
1892 establishments in South Carolina